The Sony Xperia C5 Ultra is a mid-range Android phablet smartphone developed and manufactured by Sony. It serves as the successor to the Xperia C4. The phone was unveiled on 3 August 2015 alongside the Xperia M5.

The key features of the phone is the twin 13 megapixel rear & front camera and its near borderless 6.0 inch (152.4 mm) display with a width of 3 inches (79.6 mm).

Specifications

Hardware
The Sony Xperia C5 Ultra has a 6.0-inch IPS LCD display, an octa-core 1.7 GHz Cortex-A53 Mediatek MT6752 processor, 2 GBs of RAM and 16 GBs of internal storage that can be expanded using a microSD card of up to 256 GB. The phone has a 2930 mAh Li-Ion battery, 13 MP rear camera with an LED flash and 13 MP front-facing camera with auto-focus. It is available in Black, White and Mint colors.

Software
The Sony Xperia C5 Ultra launched with Android 5.0 Lollipop. In January 2016, Android 5.1 Lollipop was released for the device. Later, in September 2016, Android 6.0 Marshmallow was released for the Xperia C5 Ultra.

Sales
The phone was first released on 14 August 2015 in Hong Kong. However, two days after its launch date, the phone's pre-sales were sold out in Hong Kong. The dual SIM version of the phone launched in India on 26 August.

References

External links
 White Paper
 Official Press Release
 Official Website

Android (operating system) devices
Sony smartphones
Mobile phones introduced in 2015